Cimarron Hills is an unincorporated community and a census-designated place (CDP) located in and governed by El Paso County, Colorado, United States. Cimarron Hills is an enclave of the City of Colorado Springs. The CDP is a part of the Colorado Springs, CO Metropolitan Statistical Area. The population of the Cimarron Hills CDP was 16,161 at the United States Census 2010. The Colorado Springs post office (Zip Codes 80914, 80915, and 80922) serves the area.

Geography

Demographics

Transportation
Highway: Cimarron Hills is 1.5 miles north of U.S. Highway 24. It is also 9 miles from Interstate 25.

Air: The community is three miles north of the Colorado Springs Airport.

Rail: (Historical information)  In 1888, the Chicago, Rock Island and Pacific Railroad began construction of a main line between Limon and Colorado Springs, passing through Cimarron Hills.  The Rocky Mountain Rocket provided passenger service from 1939 to 1966. In later years, the Cadillac and Lake City Railroad provided service between Cimarron Hills and Limon.  Although the tracks were removed in the 1980s, the railroad grade can still be seen as a prominent U-shape in aerial images of Cimarron Hills.

See also

Outline of Colorado
Index of Colorado-related articles
State of Colorado
Colorado cities and towns
Colorado census designated places
Colorado counties
El Paso County, Colorado
List of statistical areas in Colorado
Front Range Urban Corridor
South Central Colorado Urban Area
Colorado Springs, CO Metropolitan Statistical Area

References

External links

El Paso County website

Census-designated places in El Paso County, Colorado
Census-designated places in Colorado